Pennfield High School is the lone public high school of the Pennfield School District which serves Pennfield Township just north of Battle Creek in Calhoun County, Michigan.

Demographics
The demographic breakdown of the 675 students enrolled in 2015-2016 was:
Male - 48.9%
Female - 51.1%
Native American/Alaskan - 1.2%
Asian/Pacific islanders - 0.6%
Black - 6.1%
Hispanic - 4.6%
White - 83.3%
Multiracial - 4.3%

36.1% of the students were eligible for free or reduced-cost lunch.

Athletics
The Pennfield Panthers compete in the Interstate 8 Athletic Conference. The school colors are green and white. The following Michigan High School Athletic Association (MHSAA) sanctioned varsity sports are offered:

Baseball (boys)
Basketball (girls and boys)
Girls state champion - 1980
Bowling (girls and boys)
Competitive cheer (girls)
Cross country (girls and boys)
Football (boys)
State champion - 1991
Golf (girls and boys)
Lacrosse (boys)
Soccer (girls and boys)
Softball (girls)
Swim and dive (girls and boys)
Tennis (girls and boys)
Track and field (girls and boys)
Volleyball (girls)
State champion - 1979, 1981
Wrestling (boys)
State champion - 1992

Notable alumni
Lance Barber, television actor
Randy Erskine, professional golfer
Rob Van Dam, professional wrestler

References

External links
Pennfield High School

Public high schools in Michigan
Schools in Calhoun County, Michigan
Educational institutions established in 1953
1953 establishments in Michigan